The Man at the Gate is a 1941 British drama film directed by Norman Walker and starring Wilfrid Lawson. It was released in the U.S. as Men of the Sea.

Cast
 William Freshman as George Foley
 Hubert Harben as Rev.Trant
 Mary Jerrold as Mrs. Foley
 Trefor Jones as Mr. Moneypenny
 Wilfrid Lawson as Henry Foley
 Kathleen O'Regan as Ruth
 Charles Rolfe as Mr. Portibel
 Leonard Sharp as Man Who Brings Message To Church
 Harry Terry as Fisherman

References

Bibliography
 Murphy, Robert. Realism and Tinsel: Cinema and Society in Britain 1939-48. Routledge, 1992.

External links

1941 films
British drama films
1941 drama films
1940s English-language films
Films shot at Denham Film Studios
Films directed by Norman Walker
British black-and-white films
1940s British films